Red Tails is a 2012 American war film directed by Anthony Hemingway in his feature film directorial debut, and starring Terrence Howard and Cuba Gooding Jr. The film is about the Tuskegee Airmen, a group of African-American United States Army Air Forces (USAAF) servicemen during World War II. The characters in the film are fictional, although based on real individuals. The film was produced by Lucasfilm and released by 20th Century Fox, and would be the last film Lucasfilm released before being purchased by The Walt Disney Company nine months later. This was Cuba Gooding Jr.'s first theatrically released film in five years since his starring role in 2007's Daddy Day Camp.

John Ridley wrote the screenplay. Additional material was shot the following year with executive producer George Lucas as director and Aaron McGruder as writer of the reshoots. It was filmed in March and July 2009. Red Tails was a personal project for Lucas, one that he had originally conceived in 1988. It is the first Lucasfilm production since the 1994 film Radioland Murders that is not associated with the Indiana Jones or Star Wars franchises. Terrence Howard had previously portrayed a Tuskegee pilot in Hart's War, and Cuba Gooding Jr. had previously starred in The Tuskegee Airmen, an HBO made-for-television film about the same group of pilots.

Plot

In 1944, as the air war over Europe enters a deadly phase with increasing losses of Allied bombers, the 332d Fighter Group (the Tuskegee Airmen) consisting of young African-American USAAF fighter pilots, after enduring racism throughout their recruitment and training in the Tuskegee training program, are sent into combat in Italy. Flying worn-out Curtiss P-40 Warhawk aircraft and chafing at their ground attack missions, the Tuskegee Airmen recognize that they may never fight the Luftwaffe. The tight-knit group of Captain Martin "Easy" Julian, 1st Lt. Joe "Lightning" Little, 2nd Lt. Ray "Ray Gun" Gannon, 2nd Lt. Andrew "Smokey" Salem, and 2nd Lt. Samuel "Joker" George under the guidance of Major Emanuel Stance and Col. A.J. Bullard, face a white military bureaucracy still resistant to accepting black flyers as equals.

Strife develops between friends Easy and Lightning, each of whom battles his own inner demons: Lightning is a hotheaded and reckless pilot, while Easy is an alcoholic prone to self-doubt. After returning to base, Lightning becomes infatuated with Sofia, an Italian woman, and starts a relationship. When Lightning punches a white man who uses a racial slur at a "whites only" officer's club, he is sent to the brig and reprimanded by Colonel Bullard.

Meanwhile, Bullard secures a chance to "light up the board" when the Tuskegee Airmen are chosen to support the Allied landings at Anzio, Italy known as Operation Shingle. There, they battle Messerschmitt Bf 109 fighters led by a German ace pilot they nickname "Pretty Boy" and manage to raze the base that Pretty Boy retreats back to. Pretty Boy is stunned to see the pilots who damaged his plane and razed his base were African-Americans. During their first victory, Ray Gun is injured by anti-aircraft fire and suffers impaired vision in one eye. Easy reluctantly allows Ray Gun to continue flying.

Impressed with the Tuskegee Airmen's performance, the USAAF Bomber Command ask Bullard to use his fighters as escorts for Boeing B-17 Flying Fortress bombers because of unacceptably high casualties among bomber crews. Bullard accepts on the condition his unit be supplied with the new North American P-51 Mustang. The tails of the aircraft are painted bright red and become the unofficial name of the outfit. Noting the reckless aggression of previous escort fights, Bullard orders his pilots to stay with the bombers at all costs. Their first escort mission is a success, and the 332nd downs multiple Luftwaffe aircraft without the loss of a single bomber. Lightning even takes his chances to attack a Kriegsmarine destroyer before returning to base. However, Ray Gun is shot down and captured by a Wehrmacht patrol, while Deke crash-lands and nearly dies, but is rescued from his burning Mustang before the fuel tank explodes.

As a result of his injuries, Deke is discharged. Ray Gun is taken to Stalag 18, a German POW camp. A group of POWs recruit him, as they believe that he cannot be a German spy. Easy blames himself for Ray Gun's apparent departure, and spirals deeper into alcoholism. Worried, Lightning makes a deal with Easy: he will fly less recklessly as long as Easy remains sober. Meanwhile, attitudes against the Tuskegee Airmen begin to change as they earn the bomber crews' respect. Lightning proposes to Sofia, who accepts as long as he stays in Italy. Ray Gun and his group of POWs escape, but German guards spot several POWs; Ray Gun draws the Germans' attention while the others escape. One of the POWs reaches the 332nd's base and, assuming Ray Gun to be dead, informs them about his sacrifice.

The Tuskegee Airmen are tasked with escorting the first American bombers to attack Berlin, though for propaganda reasons they are only asked to escort the bombers on the first leg of their journey. When the fighter squadron meant to relieve them never arrives, Easy stays with bombers. They are attacked by Pretty Boy, now leading a flight of the revolutionary new Messerschmitt Me 262 jet fighters. Despite being outclassed, the Tuskegee Airmen shoot down several enemies, and escort a wounded B-17 back to Allied airspace. Pretty Boy nearly shoots down Easy, but at the last moment, Lightning attacks and kills Pretty Boy in a head-on attack. Although victorious, Lightning is mortally wounded and dies, and his Mustang crashes. Easy then has to inform Sofia about Lightning's death, and consequently overcomes his alcoholism. At Lightning's funeral, Ray Gun returns, having survived his escape from German captivity, invoking Lightning's memory.

Ultimately, the Tuskegee Airmen are awarded the Presidential Unit Citation in honor of their achievements.

Cast

 Terrence Howard as Col. A.J. Bullard
 Cuba Gooding Jr. as Major Emanuel Stance
 Nate Parker as Capt. Martin "Easy" Julian
 David Oyelowo as 1st Lt. Joe "Lightning" Little
 Tristan Wilds as 2nd Lt. Ray "Ray Gun" or "Junior" Gannon
 Ne-Yo as 2nd Lt. Andrew "Smokey" Salem
 Elijah Kelley as 2nd Lt. Samuel "Joker" George
 Marcus T. Paulk as 2nd Lt. David "The Deacon" Watkins
 Leslie Odom Jr. as Declan "Winky" Hall
 Michael B. Jordan as Flight Officer Maurice "Bumps" Wilson
 Method Man as Cpl. "Sticks"
 Bryan Cranston as Col. William Mortamus
 Kevin Phillips as 2nd Lt. Leon "Neon" Edwards
 Andre Royo as 1st Sgt. "Coffee" Coleman
 Lee Tergesen as Col. Jack Tomilson
 Gerald McRaney as Lieutenant General Luntz
 Daniela Ruah as Sofia
 Paul Fox as Capt. Miller
 Matthew Marsh as Brigadier General Hauser
 Lars van Riesen as "Pretty Boy" (the German antagonist pilot)
 Ryan Early as Captain Bryce
 Henry Garrett as Hart
 Robert Kazinsky as Chester Barnes
 Rick Otto as Flynt
 Josh Dallas as Ryan Fling
 Jermaine Johnson as "Sneeky"
 Edwina Finley as "CeCe"
 Stacie Davis as Mae
 Aml Ameen as "Bag O'Bones"
 Rupert Penry-Jones as Brig. Gen. Campbell

Production

George Lucas began developing Red Tails around 1988, after hearing of the Tuskegee Airmen from his friend George Hall, a photographer. At the time, the film was scheduled for release in 1992, with Kevin Sullivan writing the screenplay and Thomas Carter directing. Lucas originally conceived of the film as a long, detailed narrative similar to Lawrence of Arabia, and as a trilogy, but after multiple script drafts, he decided to focus on the combat portion of the story. He compared it to Tucker: The Man and His Dream as "a story too good to be true". In researching the film, Lucasfilm invited some of the surviving Tuskegee Airmen to Skywalker Ranch, where they were interviewed about their experiences during World War II. Lucasfilm was also given access to the original mission logbooks used by some of the pilots. A number of writers worked on the project until John Ridley was hired in 2007 to write the screenplay. Lucas held discussions with Samuel L. Jackson regarding Jackson possibly directing and acting in the film. Although Jackson praised the script, he did not commit to either role. Anthony Hemingway, a former production assistant for Lucas' The Young Indiana Jones Chronicles TV series, was ultimately chosen to direct in 2008.

Pre-production began in January 2009, with location scouting having taken place in June 2008 in Prague, Czech Republic, Italy and Croatia. Lucas invited storyboard artist David Russell (son of Tuskegee Airman James C. Russell) to design key aerial combat sequences. Production began in March 2009 with high-definition Sony F35 cameras used for principal photography, which took place in the Czech Republic, Italy, Croatia and England over a period from August to December. While shooting in the Czech Republic, the actors also underwent a "boot camp" program, during which they lived in similar conditions to the actual Tuskegee Airmen.

Harkening back to his early work on Star Wars where he had studied World War II aerial footage to create the space aerobatics performed by Rebel X-wings and TIE fighters, Lucas was familiar with World War II aerial combat. The Lucas template for photographing computer-generated imagery (CGI) dogfighting "involved lots of action, continuous motion, moving camera, streaks, loops and rolls, and all of the things aerial photography allows you to do in live action." Aerial scenes in Red Tails involved actors sitting in a gimbal-mounted cockpits (and mock-up fuselages and wings), in front of a green screen, rocked back and forth by production crew members.  In order to achieve a realistic reaction, actors were flown in actual P-51 Mustangs at the Planes of Fame in Chino, California, to experience the forces involved in dogfighting.

Editing began while the production was in Prague. Avid editing systems were used simultaneously in a Prague studio and at Lucasfilm.  A vehicle was fitted with a "technical center" so that the production could quickly move between locations. Red Tails was the first film to use Barco's Auro-3D 11.1 surround sound system.

In March 2010, Lucas took over direction of reshoots, as Hemingway was busy working on episodes of the HBO series, Treme. The Boondocks creator Aaron McGruder was brought in late in production, after Hemingway's principal photography, to provide re-writes for the Lucas-directed reshoots.

In April 2009, Tuskegee Airman Lt. Col. Lee A. Archer, Jr. was appointed an advisor for Red Tails. He died in 2010 while the film was in post-production, and the final credits bear a tribute to him.

Lucas covered the cost of production with his own money, and provided a further US$35 million for distribution. In an interview on The Daily Show on January 9, 2012, Lucas stated that the long delay in the production of the film was because major film studios balked at financing and marketing a film with an "all-black" cast and "no major white roles." He went on to explain that studios receive "60% of their profit" from overseas, and the studios feel there is no market there for films with all-black casts. Red Tails is the last film Lucasfilm made independently before being acquired by The Walt Disney Company on October 30, 2012.

Reception
The site's consensus reads: "Despite a worthy fact-based story and obvious good intentions, Red Tails suffers from one-dimensional characters, corny dialogue, and heaps of clichés." On Metacritic, the film also holds a score of 46 out of 100, based on 32 critics, indicating "mixed or average reviews". Audiences polled by CinemaScore gave the film an average grade of "A" on an A+ to F scale.

The main criticism was directed to the tone of the film; Stephen Holden in The New York Times review, noted, "In structure and tone, Red Tails proudly harks back to the 1940s and '50s, when good guys were good, and bad guys bad." In rebuttal, co-writer Aaron McGruder commented on the film's tone: "Some people are going to like this tonal choice and some people are going to say, 'Oh it should've been heavier and it should've been more dramatic.' But there's a version of this that doesn't have to be Saving Private Ryan. We can be Star Wars, as crazy as it is." Roger Ebert of the Chicago Sun-Times gave the film two-and-a-half stars out of four, stating, "Red Tails (is) entertaining. Audiences are likely to enjoy it. The scenes of aerial combat are skillfully done and exciting." In a similar vein, aviation historian Budd Davison, in agreement with fellow historian Barrett Tillman, although cognizant of the "Hollywood treatment", had a caution to aviation enthusiasts looking for a faithful reenactment of the Tuskegee legend, "... buy some popcorn, lean back and enjoy, this is Hollywood telling a story, not making a documentary. Save your guffaws until afterward with your friends."

Ina Diane Archer, daughter of Lee Archer (Tuskegee airman and advisor for Red Tails), in writing for Film Comment, criticizes the film's disconnect between aerial scenes and the rest of the film, saying, "One longs for more scenes between the ensemble on the ground, but the emphasis on aerial (and digital) technology leaves the characters without context. There's a particularly troubling absence of black women (but for a painting on Lightning's plane) who go unmentioned—no gal back home? no sisters, no Mamas?—nor do we ever see the African Americans who followed the squadron's adventures."

In the face of media criticism of the portrayals of the Tuskegee Airmen in Red Tails, a number of activists took to social media to protest against what was thought to be a racially tinged effort to denigrate the contribution of the wartime fighting unit. Beginning with statements to support the film made by surviving Tuskegee Airmen who had seen the film in previews, and spurred by the comments made by Lucas in a candid interview on The Daily Show where the producer openly discussed the difficulties of trying to get Red Tails made over the past 23 years, a Facebook campaign was started. In the Oakland, California premiere, two sold-out screenings were a testament to the success of the campaign. Effie Tesfahun, one of the organizers, explained, "When [Lucas] said Hollywood does not want to touch black films, it really hit me ... I thought we should get together and all go and support [this film]. Regardless of what Hollywood thinks, we all want to see positive messages of black people in the movies ... We need to speak, and speak loud, and speak with our dollars, because that's where people pay attention, when you start talking with your money," Tesfahun said. "We are sending a message that this is what we want." Lucas commented on the film's reception: "It had an effect on a lot of kids and adults. Now it's the one thing that everyone comes up to me and says 'thank you' for – I'm proud of that." "We didn't get to a point when [the film studios] said, 'Oh let's just do black movies.' But every time you poke 'em, it makes an effect."

Adolph Reed, professor of political science at the University of Pennsylvania, said the film "trivializes segregation in the military by reducing it to a matter of bad or outmoded attitudes. The ironic effect is significant understatement of both the obstacles the Tuskegee airmen faced and their actual accomplishments by rendering them as backdrop for a blackface, slapped-together remake of Top Gun".

Awards
Red Tails received a nomination at the 2012 Teen Choice Awards for "Choice Action Movie", and was also nominated at the 2012 BET Awards for "Best Movie".

Later, in February 2013, Red Tails won the NAACP Image Award in the categories of "Outstanding Motion Picture" and "Outstanding Independent Motion Picture" at the 44th NAACP Image Awards. In addition, George Lucas was honoured with the "Vanguard Award". The film was also nominated for "Outstanding Writing in a Motion Picture" and "Outstanding Directing in a Motion Picture", while Ne-Yo was nominated for "Outstanding Duo or Group".

Historical accuracy
Red Tails portrays largely fictional events based on the exploits of the Tuskegee airmen, although many viewers were left with the impression that the film was entirely historically accurate. Through a series of three webinars, entitled: "Tuskegee Airman Webinars – 'Was the Movie Accurate'?" sponsored by the Commemorative Air Force's Red Tail Squadron, surviving Tuskegee Airmen Colonel Charles McGee and Colonel Harold Brown provided perspectives related to the film's interpretation. Although discussions as to use of equipment and dates were mentioned, three claims made in the film were the most contentious: the number of losses suffered by bomber crews under escort, the encounters with Luftwaffe jet fighters and the overall record established by the Tuskegee Airmen.

According to period records, it was long believed that the Tuskegee Airmen did not lose a single bomber due to enemy fire, a statement made by a bomber pilot in the film. However, this claim has been proven inaccurate, and an Air Force report from 2006 showed that at least 25 bombers were lost to enemy fire. As depicted in the climactic scene, the Luftwaffe Me 262 interception of a Tuskegee Airmen escort mission did not result in the first victory over the vaunted jet fighters, credited to another U.S. unit much earlier in the war. The film also states in the epilogue that the Tuskegee Airmen established one of the best fighter records in the U.S. Air Force. The film notes, correctly, that 96 Distinguished Flying Crosses were awarded to the unit and 66 Tuskegee Airmen were killed in action. Officially, however, the Tuskegee Airmen did not produce a single fighter pilot ace, although Lee Archer's record is still in dispute.

At the end of webinars, host Brad Lang, the CAF Red Tail Squadron Leader, described the interaction as important to reconciling the historical record with the Red Tails film's essentially dramatic retelling of the Tuskegee Airmen saga. Both colonels also agreed that the discussions were important to resolving the controversy over the film.

The movie has also been criticized for portraying the unit's commander as only having a desk job when the actual commander, Lt. Col. (later Gen.) Benjamin O. Davis Jr. flew many combat missions (because both black and white commanders needed such on-the-job training).

Home media
Red Tails was released on DVD and Blu-ray/DVD combo, as well as via digital download, on May 22, 2012. It topped DVD and Blu-ray sale charts during its first week of release. The Blu-ray/DVD combo includes Double Victory, a companion documentary to the film that debuted on January 13, 2012 on H2. It details the full real-life story of the Tuskegee Airmen, and includes interviews with many of the surviving members. The Blu-ray/DVD combo also includes several featurettes that focus on the film's cast and crew. The only bonus feature included on the regular DVD edition is a series of "highlights" from Double Victory.

In popular culture
The film had a presence at 2011's New York Comic Con; Lucasfilm sponsored a panel featuring many of the cast and crew, as well as a P-51 flight simulator. The P-51 Mustang flown in Red Tails also became a free add-on for Microsoft Flight, as of 2012, and can be downloaded from Microsoft's Xbox LIVE Marketplace.

See also

 Fly, a 2009 play about the Tuskegee Airmen
 The Tuskegee Airmen, a 1995 HBO television movie on the Tuskegee Airmen
 List of black films of the 2010s
 Eugene Bullard, the first African-American military pilot, in whose honor the movie's Col. A.J. Bullard is named

References

Notes

Citations

Bibliography

 Cooper, Charlie, Ann Cooper and Roy La Grone. Tuskegee's Heroes. St. Paul: Minnesota: Motorbooks International Publishing Company, 1996. .
 Kline, Sally, ed. George Lucas: Interviews (Conversations with Filmmakers series). Jackson, Mississippi: University Press of Mississippi, 1999. .
 Nijboer, Donald. No 126 Wing RCAF (Aviation Elite Units). Oxford, UK: Osprey Publishing, 2010. .
 O'Leary, Michael. North American Aviation P-51 Mustang (Osprey Production Line to Frontline 1). Oxford, UK: Osprey, 1998. .
 Tillman, Barrett. "Tales of the Red Tails; Inside the Tuskegee Legend: The men, the machines, the missions." Flight Journal, February 2012.
 Windham, Ryder, Daniel Wallace and Pablo Hidalgo. Star Wars: Year By Year – A Visual Chronicle. New York: DK Publishing, 2010. .

External links

 Official Lucasfilm website
 Official Fox Movies website
 
 
 
 
 
 Official YouTube channel
 (now defunct; obtained from Internet Archive)

2012 films
2012 war drama films
20th Century Fox films
American aviation films
American war drama films
2010s English-language films
African-American biographical dramas
African-American war films
American docudrama films
Films about interracial romance
Films about race and ethnicity
Films about the United States Army Air Forces
World War II films based on actual events
Films set in 1944
Films set in Italy
Films shot in Croatia
Films shot in England
Films shot in Italy
Films shot in the Czech Republic
Tuskegee Airmen
War adventure films
World War II aviation films
Lucasfilm films
Films with screenplays by John Ridley
Films scored by Terence Blanchard
Films produced by Rick McCallum
2012 directorial debut films
2012 drama films
2010s American films